Jo-Wilfried Tsonga was the defending champion, but lost in the final to Ernests Gulbis 6–7(5–7), 4–6.

Seeds
The top four seeds receive a bye into the second round.

 Richard Gasquet (semifinals)
 Jo-Wilfried Tsonga (final)
 Ernests Gulbis (champion)
 Andreas Seppi (second round)
 Ivan Dodig (quarterfinals)
 Édouard Roger-Vasselin (quarterfinals)
 Julien Benneteau (second round)
 Nicolas Mahut (quarterfinals)

Draw

Finals

Top half

Bottom half

Qualifying

Seeds

 Adrian Ungur (second round)
 Daniel Evans (qualified)
 Damir Džumhur (second round)
 Ričardas Berankis (qualified)
 Guillaume Rufin (first round)
 Marco Cecchinato (first round)
 David Guez (qualified)
 James Ward (qualifying competition)

Qualifiers

Qualifying draw

First qualifier

Second qualifier

Third qualifier

Fourth qualifier

References
 Main Draw
 Qualifying Draw

Open 13 - Singles
2014 Singles